The 2018 VTV Cup is the 15th staging of the international tournament. The tournament will held in Hà Tĩnh, Vietnam.

Pool composition

Preliminary round
All times are local: Vietnam Standard Time (UTC+07:00).

Group A 

|}

|}

Group B 

|}

|}

Final round 
All times are local: Vietnam Standard Time (UTC+07:00).

Quarterfinals 

|}

5th–8th semifinals 

|}

Semifinals 

|}

7th place 

|}

5th place 

|}

3rd place 

|}

Final 

|}

Final standing

Awards
Most Valuable Player
 Trần Thị Thanh Thúy
Best Outside Spikers
 Kristina Belova
 Son Hyang-mi
Best Setter
 Nguyễn Linh Chi
Best Opposite Spiker
 Đặng Thị Kim Thanh
Best Middle Blockers
 Zhang Xiaoya
 Bùi Thị Ngà
Best Libero
 Nguyễn Thị Kim Liên
Miss VTV Cup 2018
 Đặng Thị Kim Thanh

References

VTV International Women's Volleyball Cup
2018 in women's volleyball